The International Encyclopedia of Ethics is an 11-volume encyclopedia of ethics edited by Hugh LaFollette. The encyclopedia was given Honorable Mention in competition for the Best Reference Work of 2013 by the Research User Services Association.

Reception
The book has been reviewed by John Martin Fischer, Jennifer A. Herdt, Peter Singer and Larry S. Temkin.

References

External links 
 The International Encyclopedia of Ethics

Ethics books
2013 non-fiction books
2018 non-fiction books
Wiley (publisher) books
Online encyclopedias
English-language encyclopedias
Encyclopedias of philosophy